Taipei Mass Rapid Transit (MRT), branded as Metro Taipei, is a rapid transit system serving the areas of Taipei and New Taipei in Taiwan, operated by the government-owned Taipei Rapid Transit Corporation, which also operates the Maokong Gondola.

Taipei Metro was the first metro system ever built in Taiwan. The initial network was approved for construction in 1986 and work began two years later. It began operations on March 28, 1996, and by 2000, 62 stations were in service across three main lines. Over the next nine years, the number of passengers had increased by 70%. Since 2008, the network has expanded to 131 stations and the passenger count has grown by another 66%, making it one of the world's busiest metro systems. 

The system has been praised by locals for its effectiveness in relieving growing traffic congestion in Taipei and its surrounding satellite towns, with over two million trips made daily.

History

Proposal and construction

The idea of constructing the Taipei Metro was first put forth at a press conference on 28 June 1968, where the Minister of Transportation and Communications Sun Yun-suan announced his ministry's plans to begin researching the possibility of constructing a rapid transit network in the Taipei metropolitan area; however, the plan was shelved due to financial concerns and the belief that such a system was not urgently needed at the time. With the increase of traffic congestion accompanying economic growth in the 1970s, the need for a rapid transit system became more pressing. In February 1977, the Institute of Transportation (IOT) of the Ministry of Transportation and Communications (MOTC) released a preliminary rapid transport system report, with the designs of five lines, including U1, U2, U3, S1, and S2, to form a rough sketch of the planned corridors, resulting in the first rapid transit system plan for Taipei.

In 1981, the IOT invited British Mass Transit Consultants (BMTC) and China Engineering Consultants, Inc. to form a team and provide in-depth research on the preliminary report. In 1982, the Taipei City Government commissioned National Chiao Tung University to do a research and feasibility study on medium-capacity rapid transit systems. In January 1984, the university proposed an initial design for a medium-capacity rapid transit system in Taipei City, including plans for Wenhu line and Tamsui–Xinyi line of the medium-capacity metro system. On March 1, 1985, the Executive Yuan Council for Economic Planning and Development (CEPD) signed a treaty with the Taipei Transit Council (TTC), composed of three American consultant firms, to do overall research on a rapid transit system in metropolitan Taipei. Apart from adjustments made to the initial proposal, Wenhu line of the medium-capacity metro system was also included into the network. In 1986, the initial network design of the Taipei Metro by the CEPD was passed by the Executive Yuan, although the network corridors were not yet set. A budget of NT$441.7 billion was allocated for the project.

On 27 June 1986, the Preparatory Office of Rapid Transit Systems was created, which on 23 February 1987 was formally established as the Department of Rapid Transit Systems (DORTS) for the task of handling, planning, design, and construction of the system. Apart from preparing for the construction of the metro system, DORTS also made small changes to the metro corridor. The 6 lines proposed on the initial network were: Tamsui line and Xindian line (Lines U1 and U2), Zhonghe Line (Line U3), Nangang Line and Banqiao Line (Line S1), and Muzha (now Wenhu) line (Wenhu line medium-capacity), totaling 79 stations and  route length, including  of elevated rail,  at ground level, and  underground. The Neihu Line corridor was approved later in 1990. On 27 June 1994, the Taipei Rapid Transit Corporation (TRTC) was formed to oversee the operation of the Taipei Metro system.

The Executive Yuan approved the initial network plan for the system on 27 May 1986. Ground was broken and construction began on 15 December 1988. The growing traffic problems of the time, compounded by road closures due to TRTS construction led to what became popularly known as the "dark age of Taipei traffic". The TRTS was the center of political controversy during its construction and shortly after the opening of its first line in 1996 due to incidents such as computer malfunction during a thunderstorm, alleged structural problems in some elevated segments, budget overruns, and fare prices.

Opening and Initial network 
On 23 December 1998, the system passed the milestone of 100 million passengers.

1999–2006 Expansions 
This section became the first east–west line running through the city, connecting the two previously completed north–south lines. On 31 May 2006, the second stage of the Banqiao–Nangang section and the Tucheng section began operation. The service was then named Bannan after the districts that it connects (Banqiao and Nangang).

Maokong Gondola 

On 4 July 2007, the Maokong Gondola, a new aerial lift/cable-car system, was opened to the public. Service was suspended on 1 October 2008 due to erosion from mudslides under a support pillar following Typhoon Jangmi. The gondola officially resumed service as of 31 March 2010, after relocation of the pillar and passing safety inspections.

2009–2014 expansions 
Due to debate on whether to construct a medium-capacity or high-capacity line, construction of the line did not begin until 2002.

Prior to 2014, only physical lines had official names; services did not.

Following the completion of the core sections of the system in 2014, the naming scheme for services was set and 'lines' started to referred to services. Between 2014 and 2016, lines were given alternative number names based on the order of the dates the lines first opened. Brown, Red, Green, Orange and Blue lines were named lines 1 to 5 respectively. The planned Circular, Wanda–Shulin and Minsheng–Xizhi lines were to be lines 6 to 8 respectively. In 2016, the number names were replaced by colour names. Today, on-board announcements in Chinese use full official names, whereas in English, colour names are used instead.

2020 expansion 

On 31 January 2020, the Circular line opened as the sixth main line of the Taipei Metro. Electromechanical equipment for the line is supplied by Hitachi Rail STS, including driverless technology and CBTC Radio signalling. In February 2020, free rides were offered to passengers in order to raise awareness and test the route's popularity.

Timeline of services

Size

Lines

The system is designed based on the spoke-hub distribution paradigm, with most rail lines running radially outward from central Taipei. The MRT system operates daily from 06:00 to 00:00 the following day (the last trains finish their runs by 01:00), with extended services during special events (such as New Year festivities). Trains operate at intervals of 1:30 to 15 minutes depending on the line and time of day. Smoking is forbidden in the entire metro system, while eating, drinking, and chewing gum and betel nuts are forbidden within the paid area.

Automated station announcements are recorded in Mandarin, English, Hokkien, and Hakka, with Japanese at busy stations.

Fares and tickets

Fares range between –65 per trip as of 2018. RFID single journey tokens and rechargeable IC cards (such as the Easycard) are used to collect fares for day-to-day use. A 20% off discount was given to all IC card users. However, the discount for IC card users was canceled at the start of February 2020. The discount program was switched to an intensity-based scheme. The more times passengers take the MRT, the higher the level of discount they could receive. For example, 10% discount is given for 11–20 rides; 20% discount is provided for 31–40 journeys; the highest discount is 30% off for more than 50 rides. The discount is considered a rebate, and is deposited to the user's card starting the first of each month from the previous month. Those with welfare cards issued by local governments could receive 60% off per ride. Children aged 6 or over pay adult fares. Other ticket types include passes, joint tickets with other services and tickets for groups and discounts for YouBike rentals at the Taipei Main Station.

Infrastructure 

The Taipei Metro provides an obstacle-free environment within the entire system; all stations and trains are handicap accessible. Features include: handicap-capable restrooms, ramps and elevators for wheelchairs and strollers, tactile guide paths, extra-wide faregates, and trains with a designated wheelchair area.

Beginning in September 2003, the English station names for Taipei Metro stations were converted to use Hanyu pinyin before the end of December, with brackets for Tongyong Pinyin names for signs shown at the station entrances and exits. However, after the conversion, many stations were reported to have multiple conflicting English station names caused by inconsistent conversions, even for stations built after enactment of the new naming policy. The information brochures (臺北市大眾捷運系統捷運站轉乘公車資訊手冊) printed in September 2004 still used Wade–Giles romanizations.

To accommodate increasing passenger numbers, all metro stations have replaced turnstiles with speed gates since 2007, and single-journey magnetic cards have been replaced by RFID tokens.
TRTS provides free mobile phone connections in all stations, trains, and tunnels and also provides WiFi WLAN connections at several station hotspots. Several stations are also equipped with mobile charging stations.

Platforms 

Most underground stations have island platform configurations while a few have side platform configurations, and vice versa for elevated/at-grade stations (a few stations have island platform configurations but the majority of elevated/at-grade stations have side platform configurations).

Each station is equipped with LED displays and LCD TVs both in the concourse and on the platforms which display the time of arrival of the next train. At all stations, red lights on or above automatic platform gates at stations flash prior to a train arrival to alert passengers and a arrival melody would play (except on the ). As of September 2018, all stations have automatic platform gates.

All lines and extensions currently under construction will be equipped with platform screen doors. A Track Intrusion Detection System has also been installed to improve passenger safety at stations without platform doors. The system uses infrared and radio detectors to monitor unusual movement in the track area.

Signalling

When the Muzha Line first opened in 1996, the line was initially equipped with automatic train operation (ATO) and automatic train control (ATC), which in turn comprised automatic train protection (ATP) and automatic train supervision (ATS); in particular the ATP relied on transmission coils and wayside control units whereas the ATO relied on dwell operation control units. The transmission coils are controlled by the Control Centre to ensure safety of the line and were positioned on the guideway. Among such coils included the PD loop, safety frequency loop, stopping program loop, vehicle station link and station vehicle link; these loops were cross-arranged to produce electromagnetic induction with the interval between two cross points being 0.3 seconds to both monitor the train and control its speed. However this fixed-block ATC system used on the Muzha Line was plagued with problems in its early years of operation and was replaced with the new moving-block Cityflo 650 CBTC that was supplied by Bombardier Transportation of Canada for the Neihu Line.

On the other hand, the heavy-capacity lines use the traditional fixed block system design, which were initially supplied by General Railway Signal of Rochester, New York, for the Tamsui, Xindian, Zhonghe, and Bannan lines; and later by Alstom for the Tucheng, Xinzhuang, Luzhou, Xinyi and Songshan lines. Key components of the system include impedance bond, 4-foot loops, marker coils, alignment antennae and two-aspect light signals for the wayside as well as automatic train supervision which utilises centralized traffic control.

The Circular Line uses CBTC Radio signalling from Ansaldo STS.

Public art 

In the initial network, important stations such as transfer stations, terminal stations, and stations with heavy passenger flow were chosen for the installation of public art. The principles behind the locations of public art were visual focus and non-interference with passenger circulation and construction schedules. The artworks included murals, children's mosaic collages, sculptures, hung forms, spatial art, interactive art, and window displays. The selection methods included open competitions, invitational competitions, direct assignments, and cooperation with children.

The bid is placed at over  million.

Other facilities 

In addition to the rapid transit system itself, Taipei Metro operates several public facilities such as underground shopping malls, parks, and public squares in and around stations, including:

Zhongshan Metro Mall:  –  –  (815 m, 81 shops).
Taipei main station underground mall: on floor B1 of the station.
Taipei New World Shopping Center: Between the metro and TRA sections of Taipei Station.
Station front metro mall: West of Taipei main station, beneath Zhongxiao W Road.
Taipei City Mall: Northwest of Taipei main station, beneath Zhengzhou Rd and Civic Blvd.
Global Mall:  floors B1 to 2F.

As of 2008 there are 102 shops within the stations themselves.

Transit

Transfers to city bus stations are available at all metro stations. In 2009, transfer volume between the metro and bus systems reached 444,100 transfers per day (counting only EasyCard users).

Taipei Songshan Airport is served by the  station. A metro system to connect Taipei to Taoyuan International Airport is also available since March 2017.

Rolling stock 
All rolling stocks on the Taipei Metro are electric multiple units, powered by a third rail at 750 volts direct current. Each train is equipped with automatic train operation (ATO) for a partial or complete automatic train piloting and driverless functions.

Medium-capacity trains
It initially used a fixed-block automatic train control (ATC) system. Each train consists of two 2-car electric multiple unit (EMU) sets, with a total of 4 cars. The Wenhu line is the only line of the system to not have open-gangway carriages, meaning that passengers cannot move between carriages when the train is moving.

The  was initially operated with VAL 256 trains cars, where two VAL 256 cars in the same set would share the same road number. As a result of this numbering scheme, the 102 cars of the VAL fleet have car numbers from 1 to 51. Integration of Bombardier's trains with the existing  proved to be difficult in the beginning, with multiple system malfunctions and failures during the first three months of operation. Retrofitting older trains also took longer than expected, as the older trains must undergo several hours of reliability tests during non-service hours. The VAL 256 trains resumed operations in December 2010.

Each train consists of a 4-car EMU set and with open-gangway connection between cars. The train runs on  without onboard operators.

Heavy-capacity trains
The heavy-capacity trains have steel wheels and are operated by an on-board train operator. The trains are computer-controlled. The operator, who is both driver and conductor, is responsible for opening and closing the doors and making (not all) announcements. Most announcements are pre-recorded in Mandarin, English, Hokkien and Hakka, with Japanese at busy stations. The ATC provides the functions of ATP, ATO and ATS and controls all train movements, including braking, acceleration and speed control, but can be manually overridden by the operator in case of an emergency. Newer trains also use a Train Supervision Information System (TSIS) supplied by Mitsubishi Electric that allows the operator to monitor the conditions of the train and identify any faults.

Each train consists of two 3-car Electric Multiple Unit (EMU) sets, with a total of 6 cars. Each 3-car EMU set is permanently coupled as DM–T–M, where DM is the motor car with full-width cab, T is a trailer car and M is the motor car without cab. Each motor car has four 3-phase AC traction motors. The configuration of a 6-car train is DM–T–M+M–T–DM, not interchanged with other car types. Like many contemporary metro rolling stock designs such as the MOVIA by Bombardier, each train features open gangways, allowing passengers to move freely between cars.

The first digit of a DM car is 1, while that of a T car is 2 and that of an M car is 3. This digit then follows the three digits of the set number. For example, C301 set 001/002 consists of carriages 1001-2001-3001+3002-2002-1002.

A single set cannot be in revenue service except C371 single sets 397–399, where their M car is exactly a DM car despite its first digit being 3. These single sets run exclusively on the Xinbeitou and Xiaobitan branch lines. Before the C371 single sets were in revenue service on 22 July 2006, the M cars of C301 sets 013/014 were converted to temporary cab cars to run the Xinbeitou branch.

In 2010, the new C381 was built for Taipei Metro to cope with increasing passenger ridership and the expansion of its network route. Upon entering service on 7 October 2012, three C381 trainsets are servicing the Beitou – Taipower Building segment of the Tamsui and Xindian Lines, with the remaining fleet being put into service on 20 October 2012. These trains provided much-needed capacity increase when the Xinyi and Songshan extensions opened in late 2013. Whereas the earlier heavy capacity train types have largely retained the same design, the C381 sets are more distinctive with double blue stripes and the re-positioning of the logo from the driver's door to well below the passenger's windows, right on the stripe. Also placed were the more "sleeker" cab and the new advertising screens (as seen in newer Japanese commuter trains such as the E233 series) to improve energy efficiency, although it retains the same propulsion as the C371s.

Fleet roster

Medium-capacity fleet

Heavy-capacity fleet

Engineering trains
Taipei Metro also uses a fleet of specialised trains for maintenance of way purposes:

Depots 
The system currently has 10 depots, with more under construction.

Reception 

Taipei Metro is one of the most expensive rapid transit systems ever constructed, with phase one of the system costing US$18 billion and phase two estimated to have cost US$13.8 billion.

Despite earlier controversy, by the time the first phase of construction was completed in 2000, it was generally agreed that the metro project was a success, and it has since become an essential part of life in Taipei. The system has been effective in reducing traffic congestion in the city and has spurred the revival of satellite towns (like Tamsui) and development of new areas (like Nangang). The system has also helped to increase average vehicle speed for routes running from New Taipei into Taipei. Property prices along metro routes (both new and existing) tend to increase with the opening of more lines.

Since the Taipei Metro joined the Nova International Railway Benchmarking Group and the Community of Metros (Nova/CoMET) in 2002, it has started collecting and analysing data of the 33 Key Performance Indicators set by Nova/CoMET in order to compare them with those of other metro systems around the world, as a reference to improve its operation. Taipei Metro also has gained keys to success from case studies on different subjects such as safety, reliability, and incidents, and from the operational experiences of other metro systems.

According to a study conducted by the Railway Technology Strategy Center at Imperial College London, and data gathered by Nova/CoMET, the Taipei Metro has ranked number 1 in the world for four consecutive years in terms of reliability, safety, and quality standards (2004–2007). The most congested route sections handle over 38,000 commuters per hour during peak times.

On New Year's Eve 2009 and New Year's Day 2010, the Metro system transported 2.17 million passengers in 42 consecutive hours. On 22 April 2010 after 14 years of service, the system achieved the milestone of 4 billion cumulative riders. On 29 December 2010, the system passed the benchmark of 500 million annual passengers for the first time. The record for single day ridership hit 2.5 million passengers during the New Year's Eve celebrations on 31 December 2010.

In May 2016, the Singapore Transport Minister, Khaw Boon Wan, said that his country's rail operators, SBS Transit and SMRT, should emulate the example of Taipei Metro. Speaking at a rail engineering forum, he cited the Taipei Metro's timely maintenance and replacement of assets, as well as its fast response to rail network problems. Khaw said the Singapore Land Transport Authority (LTA) is working with the TRTC to attach staff from SBS and SMRT to its metro workshops, so they can learn from its asset maintenance practices and engineering improvements.

Future expansions 

Several lines are planned to be added to the network.

Wanda–Zhonghe–Shulin line (Light Green line) 

Wanda–Zhonghe–Shulin is a metro line under construction.

The entire line is expected to be fully completed around late 2028.

Phase 2 and 3 of Circular line (Yellow line)

Phase 2 of Circular line is under design and projected to start construction in early 2021. Phase 2 consists of Northern Section and Southern Section. This section will service Wugu, Luzhou, Shilin and Neihu.

Minsheng–Xizhi line (Sky Blue line) 

Minsheng–Xizhi is a planned metro line. As of February 2011, New Taipei has been pursuing the construction of the 17.52-km Minsheng–Xizhi line, though the most recent plan was rejected by the Ministry of Transportation and Communications, citing the need for further evidence for the line's viability. The city plans to re-submit the proposal, and the project is estimated to cost NT$42.2 billion (US$1.44 billion). A possible 4.25-km extension of the line to connect with the planned Keelung light rail is also being considered. The line is planned to be built partially underground and partially elevated. It will begin from Dadaocheng Harbour beneath Minsheng West Road in Taipei, run along Minsheng East and West Roads, pass through Minsheng Community and journey under the Keelung River towards the Neihu District. The line will then change to an elevated mode and reach its termini at Xintai 5th Road in Xizhi District, New Taipei City. As of May 2018, the proposal for this line has been submitted to the Ministry Of Transportation and Communications, but has yet to be approved.

New Taipei Metro 

 the Danhai Light Rail is run by the New Taipei Metro corporation. The Circular Line is also property of the New Taipei Metro corporation, but the Taipei Metro has the operating rights.

Network Map

Safety and security

2001 typhoon flooding
On 17 September 2001, Typhoon Nari flooded all underground tracks as well as 16 stations, the heavy-capacity system operation control center, the administration building, and the Nangang Depot. The elevated  was not seriously affected and resumed operations the next day. However, the heavy-capacity lines were not restored to full operational status until three months later.

2014 stabbing attack

The attack occurred on a train near , resulting in 4 deaths and 24 injured. It was the first fatal attack on the metro system since it began operations in 1996. The suspect was 21-year-old Cheng Chieh (鄭捷), a university student at Tunghai University, who was arrested at  immediately after the incident. On 6 March 2015, Cheng Chieh was found guilty on multiple counts of murder and attempted murder, and was sentenced to death. He was subsequently executed on 10 May 2016.

Controversies
In early 2021, it was discovered that a pornographic film production company had created a series of sets which copied the design of MRT trains and stations. This caused a brief stir when it was first released as many were concerned that the films had been shot on actual MRT trains and stations. Nevertheless, it was still condemned by Taipei MRT for imitating its train carriages.

On 30 December 2021, Taipei MRT rejected an Amnesty International advertisement which featured detained human rights activist Lee Ming-che.

See also

Eastern District of Taipei
Maokong Gondola
Rail transport in Taiwan
Lists of rapid transit systems
List of metro systems

Notes

Words in native languages

References

External links

Taipei Future Rail Network Map
Taipei Rapid Transit Corporation – official website
Taipei Department of Rapid Transit Systems
Taipei City Government – official website
Taipei at UrbanRail.net

 
Underground rapid transit in Taiwan
1996 establishments in Taiwan
750 V DC railway electrification